= 1905–06 Wyoming Cowboys basketball team =

American college basketball season

1905–06 Wyoming Cowboys basketball
- Conference: Independent
- Record: 3–2
- Head coach: W. Yates (2nd season)

The 1905–06 Wyoming Cowboys basketball team represented the University of Wyoming during the 1905–06 college basketball season. Coached by W. Yates in his and the team's second season, the Cowboys went 3–2.
